Chikkabanavara  is a town in Bengaluru, Karnataka, India. It is located in the Bangalore North taluk of Bangalore Urban district in Karnataka. It has one of the oldest surviving lakes in Bangalore. The lake is located at a distance of 1.5 km north of Chikkabanavara railway station on the Bangalore-Tumkur railway line.

Demographics
 India census, Chikkabanavara had a population of 5209 with 2640 males and 2589 females.

Transport

Bus
Bangalore Metropolitan Transport Corporation run buses towards Majestic, KR Market No. 250,253,254,248 Kengeri- 502H, Krishnarajapura (KR Puram) 502A, 507C Peenya, Jalahalli, 250,250AB,250AC, Vijaynagar  248N

Rail

Nearest Railway Station Chikabanavar Junction Railway station, Yesvantpur Junction railway station 10 km away.

Air
Kempegowda International Airport 38 km

References

External links
 https://web.archive.org/web/20071116153217/http://bangaloreurban.nic.in/

Cities and towns in Bangalore Urban district